Sarıl is a village in the Zangilan District of Azerbaijan.

History 
The village was located in the Armenian-occupied territories surrounding Nagorno-Karabakh, coming under the control of ethnic Armenian forces in October 1993 during the First Nagorno-Karabakh War. The village subsequently became part of the breakaway Republic of Artsakh as part of its Kashatagh Province, referred to as Amiryan. It was recaptured by Azerbaijan during the Aras Valley campaign in the 2020 Nagorno-Karabakh war.

References

External links 

Populated places in Zangilan District